Oh Darling! Look What You've Done To Me! (Spanish:¡Ay, amor, cómo me has puesto!) is a 1951 Mexican romantic comedy film directed by Gilberto Martínez Solares and starring Germán Valdés, Rebeca Iturbide and Marcelo Chávez. A bakery delivery man falls in love with a middle-class woman after helping her following an accident, but her family object to him.

Cast
 Germán Valdés as Tin Tan  
 Rebeca Iturbide as Margarita  
 Marcelo Chávez as Patrón de la Panaderia
 Famie Kaufman as Vitola 
 Jorge Reyes as Doctor Esteban  
 Mimí Derba as Doña Beatriz, mamá de Margarita  
 Arturo Soto Rangel as don Manuel, padre de Margarita 
 Pascual García Peña as Ranilla  
 Lucrecia Muñoz as Lupita  
 José René Ruiz as Pepito  
 Club de Foot-Ball Marte
 Armando Arriola as Enfermero  
 Stephen Berne as man in the cantina  
 Enrique Carrillo as Policía 
 Fernando Curiel as Doctor  
 Magdalena Estrada as Esposa del patrón 
 Leonor Gómez as Doña Rupertota  
 Ismael Larumbe as Héctor Ramírez, novio de Margarita  
 Elvira Lodi as Tía de margarita 
 Chel López as Doctor  
 Gloria Mestre as Martita  
 Kika Meyer as Vecina 
 José Ortega as Doctor 
 Ángela Rodríguez as Vecina  
 Manuel Sánchez Navarro as Tío Roberto  
 Ramón Sánchez as Panadero 
 Manuel 'Loco' Valdés as Hombre en cantina  
 Ramón Valdés as Panadero  
 Hernán Vera as Hombre encarcelado  
 Acela Vidaurri as Amiga de Lupita

References

Bibliography 
 Carlos Monsiváis & John Kraniauskas. Mexican Postcards. Verso, 1997.

External links 
 

1951 films
1951 romantic comedy films
Mexican romantic comedy films
1950s Spanish-language films
Films directed by Gilberto Martínez Solares
Mexican black-and-white films
1950s Mexican films